Club Deportivo Fuerte Aguilares, commonly known as Fuerte Aguilares  are a Salvadoran professional football club based in Aguilares. They currently play in the Tercera Division de Fútbol Salvadoreño.

History
They were relegated from Primera División de Fútbol Profesional after 1976/1977 season. They currently play in the Segunda División de Fútbol Salvadoreño after being promoted from the third tier in 2007.

Honours

Domestic honours

Leagues
 Primera División Salvadorean and predecessors 
 Champions : N/A
 Segunda División Salvadorean and predecessors 
 Champions (1) : 1976
 Runners-up (2): 
 Tercera División Salvadorean and predecessors 
 Champions (2) : Apertura 2021
 Play-off winner (2):

Former coaches

 Ángel Orellana (2007)
 Rubén Alonso (2007)
 Ramón "El Sugar" Avilés (2008)
 Víctor Girón Huezo (2009)
 Juan Ramón Paredes (2009)
 Luis Landos (2010)
 German Francisco Pérez (2010)
 Juan Ramón "El Sugar" Avilés (2010–11)
 Ángel Orellana (2011)
 Geovani Portillo (2016)
 Osmin Orellana (2019-2020)
 Alexander Rodríguez (2021 - June 2022)
 Rafael "lito" Mariona (June 2022 -Present)

References

Fuerte Aguilares